Yves Bergeron (born January 11, 1952) is a Canadian retired ice hockey right winger. He played in the World Hockey Association for the Quebec Nordiques and in the National Hockey League for the Pittsburgh Penguins.

Bergeron was born in Malartic, Quebec. As a youth, he played in the 1964 Quebec International Pee-Wee Hockey Tournament with a minor ice hockey team from Amos, Quebec.

Career statistics

References

External links

1952 births
Canadian ice hockey right wingers
French Quebecers
Hershey Bears players
Ice hockey people from Quebec
Living people
Maine Nordiques players
People from Abitibi-Témiscamingue
Pittsburgh Penguins draft picks
Pittsburgh Penguins players
Quebec Nordiques (WHA) players
Shawinigan Bruins players